Ludwik Karol Teichmann-Stawiarski (1823–1895) was a Polish anatomist and discoverer of a new way of research in forensic medicine, after whom Teichmann crystals are called.

Life 

Teichmann was born  in Lublin.

In 1856, Teichmann became a Doctor of Medicine at the University of Göttingen. In 1861, he became a Professor of pathological anatomy at the Jagiellonian University in Kraków. and in 1868 he became a professor of descriptive and comparative anatomy there, where he also served as Rector from 1877 to 1878.

He introduced injection and corrosion techniques into pathology and used them to study the lymphatic system in health and disease. He discovered haemin crystals, now known as Teichmann's crystals.

Works 

Among his works, Das saugadersystem vom anatomischen standpunkte (1861) in particular acquired recognition.

See also 

Hemin

References

1823 births
1895 deaths
19th-century Polish scientists
Polish anatomists
Scientists from Lublin
Rectors of the Jagiellonian University